Alex Brown (born August 30, 1996) is an American football cornerback who is a member of the Edmonton Elks. He played college football at South Carolina State.

College career
Brown was a five year member of the South Carolina State Bulldogs, redshirting his true freshman season starting his final two seasons at defensive back. As a senior, Brown made 42 tackles with eight passes defended, four interceptions and one sack and was named Second-team All-Mid-Eastern Athletic Conference. He finished his collegiate career with 90 tackles, 26 passes defensed, seven interceptions and one sack in 31 games played, starting 25.

Professional career

San Francisco 49ers
Brown was signed by the San Francisco 49ers as an undrafted free agent on May 15, 2019 after participating in a rookie minicamp. Brown was waived by the 49ers on July 25, 2019.

Philadelphia Eagles
Brown was claimed off waivers by the Philadelphia Eagles, but was waived by the team two weeks later on August 4, 2019.

New York Jets
The New York Jets claimed Brown off waivers on August 5, 2019. Despite a strong showing in the preseason, Brown was waived by the Jets during final roster cuts.

Kansas City Chiefs
Brown was signed to the Kansas City Chiefs practice squad on September 2, 2019. The Chiefs promoted Brown to the active roster on December 5, 2019. Brown made his NFL debut on December 8, 2019 against the New England Patriots. Brown played in three games with two tackles in the regular season and played in all three of the Chiefs playoff games on special teams, including the Chiefs' win in Super Bowl LIV against the 49ers.

On August 16, 2020, Brown was placed on injured reserve after suffering a torn anterior cruciate ligament (ACL) in practice.

Detroit Lions
On May 17, 2021, Brown signed with the Detroit Lions. He was waived on August 15, 2021, after a wrong way drunken crash on a freeway

References

External links
South Carolina State Bulldogs bio
Kansas City Chiefs bio

1996 births
Living people
American football defensive backs
Detroit Lions players
Kansas City Chiefs players
New York Jets players
People from Holly Hill, South Carolina
Philadelphia Eagles players
Players of American football from South Carolina
San Francisco 49ers players
South Carolina State Bulldogs football players